William Buller  (1735–1796) was an English clergyman who served as Bishop of Exeter from 1792 to 1796.

Buller was born probably at Morval, Cornwall, to John Francis Buller and Rebecca Trelawney.  He was educated at Christ Church, Oxford, graduating BA in 1757, MA in 1759; BD and DD in 1781.

Buller's first ecclesiastical appointments were as rector of Brightwell and canon of Winchester Cathedral. He was also rector of North Waltham, In 1773, Buller became a canon residentiary of Windsor in 1773 and was selected dean of Exeter in 1784.  In 1790 Buller was translated as Dean of Canterbury.  Buller returned to Exeter as bishop in late 1792.

On 19 April 1762, Buller married Anne Thomas, the daughter of John Thomas, Bishop of Winchester.

Buller was a friend of George Austen, the father of Jane Austen, who educated his son Richard Buller.

William Buller died on 12 December 1796.

Notes

External links
Oxford Dictionary of National Biography page

1735 births
1796 deaths
People from Brightwell-cum-Sotwell
Alumni of Christ Church, Oxford
Bishops of Exeter
Deans of Canterbury
Deans of Exeter
Canons of Windsor
Clerks of the Closet
William
18th-century Church of England bishops